Scientists of Sound (The Blow Up Factor Vol. 1) is a Beastie Boys EP released in 1999. The tracks are remixes and alternate versions of songs released on their previous album, Hello Nasty (1998).

Track listing

Side one
"The Negotiation Limerick File" (Adam Horovitz Remix)
"Intergalactic" (Colleone/Webb Remix)
"Three MC's And One DJ" (Live Video Version)
"Body Movin'" (KutMasta Kurt Remix)

Side two
"Putting Shame In Your Game" (Prunes RMX 2)
"The Negotiation Limerick File" (Handsome Boy Modeling School Makeover)
"Body Movin'" (KutMasta Kurt Remix Instrumental)
"The Negotiation Limerick File" (A Cappella Wet)

1999 EPs
1999 remix albums
Remix EPs
Capitol Records EPs
Grand Royal EPs
Capitol Records remix albums
Grand Royal remix albums
Beastie Boys EPs
Beastie Boys remix albums